Imaginary Voyage is a studio album by French jazz fusion artist Jean-Luc Ponty. It features guitarist Daryl Stuermer and bassist  Tom Fowler (both of whom had played on Ponty’s previous album), along with keyboardist Allan Zavod and drummer Mark Craney. It was released in 1976 on Atlantic Records.

Track listing
All songs by Jean-Luc Ponty.

Side one
"New Country" – 3:07
"The Gardens of Babylon" – 5:06
"Wandering on the Milky Way" – 1:50
"Once upon a Dream" – 4:08
"Tarantula" – 4:04

Side two
"Imaginary Voyage" – 19:55
"Part I" – 2:22
"Part II" – 4:05
"Part III" – 5:28
"Part IV" – 8:00

Personnel 
 Jean-Luc Ponty – acoustic & electric violins, organ, background synthesizers
 Daryl Stuermer – acoustic & electric guitars
 Allan Zavod – acoustic piano & electric keyboards 
 Tom Fowler – electric bass
 Mark Craney – drums & percussion

Recorded at Kendun Studios, Burbank, California - July and August 1976.
Mixed at Paramount Studios, Los Angeles, California - August 1976.
Mastered at Atlantic Recording Studios, New York City, New York.

Chart positions

References

External links 
 Official artist website www.Ponty.com
 Official record label website AtlanticRecords.com
 Jean-Luc Ponty - Imaginary Voyage (1976) album review by Richard S. Ginell, credits & releases at AllMusic
 Jean-Luc Ponty - Imaginary Voyage (1976) album releases & credits at Discogs
 Jean-Luc Ponty - Imaginary Voyage (1976) album credits & user reviews at ProgArchives.com
 Jean-Luc Ponty - Imaginary Voyage (1976) album to be listened as stream on Spotify

Jean-Luc Ponty albums
1976 albums
Atlantic Records albums